Oladapo Kanyinsola "Dee" Ayuba (22 March 1986 – 2 January 2018) was a British Nigerian basketball player (forward).

Born in London, Ayuba spent four years of playing basketball for the University of Missouri-Kansas City in the NCAA. He began his professional European career for Plannja Basket from 2007-08. He returned to play for Iraklis Thessaloniki B.C. in the Greek A2 Basket League.

After that, he played five seasons for the Norrköping Dolphins, a season with Uppsala Basket, and one season with Jämtland Basket. He played several seasons in the Basketligan and won the Swedish Champion in Basketball award two times and participated in the European Cup Games with Norrköping Dolphins in 2012. By the time New Year 2018 had come and gone, Ayuba was playing for the basketball department of Djurgårdens IF from their 2016–17 season onward. He played for a season with Residence Walferdange (Luxembourg).

Death 

Ayuba died in Luxembourg on 2 January 2018 from a heart attack, age 31.

References

External links 

 Eurobaskets profile of Ayuba
 Svenska Basketball League Profile

1986 births
2018 deaths
Basketball players from Greater London
English men's basketball players
English people of Nigerian descent
Forwards (basketball)
Iraklis Thessaloniki B.C. players
Jämtland Basket players
Kansas City Roos men's basketball players
Nigerian men's basketball players
Norrköping Dolphins players
Seminole State Trojans men's basketball players
Uppsala Basket players
Djurgårdens IF Basket players